Yosmani Piker (born 26 April 1987 in Havana) is a male judoka from Cuba, who won the silver medal in the extra lightweight division (–60 kg) at the 2007 Pan American Games in Rio de Janeiro, Brazil. He represented his native country at the 2008 Summer Olympics in Beijing, PR China.

References

External links
 
 
 
 

1987 births
Living people
Judoka at the 2007 Pan American Games
Judoka at the 2008 Summer Olympics
Olympic judoka of Cuba
Sportspeople from Havana
Cuban male judoka
Pan American Games silver medalists for Cuba
Pan American Games medalists in judo
Medalists at the 2007 Pan American Games
20th-century Cuban people
21st-century Cuban people